Henry C. Courtney (b. 1856 - d. April 9, 1887) was a United States Navy sailor and a recipient of the United States military's highest decoration, the Medal of Honor.

Biography
Born in 1856 in Springfield, Illinois, Courtney joined the Navy from that state in 1873. By February 7, 1882, he was serving as a seaman on the training ship . On that day, while Portsmouth was at the Washington Navy Yard, Courtney and another sailor, Boatswain's Mate Thomas Cramen, jumped overboard and rescued Jack-of-the-Dust Charles Taliaferro from drowning. For this action, both Courtney and Cramen were awarded the Medal of Honor two and a half years later, on October 18, 1884. He left the Navy in 1886. 

Courtney's official Medal of Honor citation reads:
On board the U.S. Training Ship Portsmouth, Washington Navy Yard, 7 February 1882. Jumping overboard from that vessel, Courtney assisted in rescuing Charles Taliaferro, jack-of-the-dust, from drowning.

See also

List of Medal of Honor recipients during peacetime

References

External links

1856 births
1887 deaths
People from Springfield, Illinois
United States Navy sailors
United States Navy Medal of Honor recipients
Non-combat recipients of the Medal of Honor